Banua Lawas is a district in Tabalong Regency, South Kalimantan Province, Indonesia. The majority of population in this district is Banjar people whose belief is Islam.

Demography 
According to the 2010 Census, population of this district was 17,897, with male population of 8,692 and female population of 9,295, and gender ratio of 94. Population density was 122 per square kilometers. The latest official estimate (as at mid 2018) is 20,217.

Sites of interest 
 Cultivation of keramba fish
 Heritage Mosque of Banua Lawas
 The tomb of Penghulu Rasyid
 The tomb of a hero Sungai Durian
 Lake Undan

Gallery

References 

South Kalimantan